Our Lady of Mysterious Ailments is a dystopian futuristic fantasy novel by Zimbabwean author T. L. Huchu. The first edition was published in 2022 by Tor Books. It is Huchu's fourth novel and the second instalment in the Edinburgh Nights series which is set in Scotland.

References 

2022 Zimbabwean novels
2022 British novels
Tor Books books